Iniforis is a genus of minute sea snails with left-handed shell-coiling, marine gastropod mollusks or micromollusks in the family Triphoridae.

Species
 Iniforis aemulans (Hinds, 1843)
 Iniforis albogranosa (Kosuge, 1961)
 Iniforis bellula (Kosuge, 1961)
 Iniforis calculifera (Gould, 1861)
 Iniforis carmelae Rolán & Fernández-Garcés, 1993
 Iniforis casta (Hinds, 1843)
 Iniforis distinguenda (Dunker, 1881)
 Iniforis douvillei Jousseaume, 1884
 Iniforis ducosensis (Jousseaume, 1884)
 Iniforis formosula (Hervier, 1898)
 Iniforis fusiformis (Kosuge, 1961)
 Iniforis gudeliae Rolan & Fernández-Garcés, 2009
 Iniforis hinuhinu Kay, 1979
 Iniforis ikukoae (Kosuge, 1963)
 Iniforis immaculata Rolán & Fernández-Garcés, 1993
 Iniforis limitaris Rehder, 1980
 Iniforis malvacea Jousseaume, 1884
 Iniforis ordinata Laseron, 1958
 Iniforis peleae (F. Baker & Spicer, 1935)
 Iniforis pelorcei Rolán & Fernandez-Garcés, 2009
 Iniforis perfecta (Pease, 1871)
 Iniforis poecila (Hervier, 1898)
 Iniforis porrecta Laseron, 1958
 Iniforis progressa (Laseron, 1958)
 Iniforis pseudothomae Rolán & Fernández-Garcés, 1993
 Iniforis tuberia Laseron, 1958
 Iniforis turristhomae (Holten, 1802)
 Iniforis violacea (Quoy & Gaimard, 1834)
 Iniforis zonata Laseron, 1958
Species brought into synonymy
 Iniforis chaperi (Jousseaume, 1884): synonym of Mastoniaeforis chaperi Jousseaume, 1884
 Iniforis concors (Hinds, 1843): synonym of Euthymella concors (Hinds, 1843)
 Iniforis jousseaumei (Hervier, 1898): synonym of Mastoniaeforis jousseaumei (Hervier, 1898)
 Iniforis lifuana (Hervier, 1898): synonym of Mastoniaeforis lifuana (Hervier, 1898)
 Iniforis ofuensis (F. Baker & Spicer, 1935): synonym of Mastoniaeforis ofuensis (F. Baker & Spicer, 1935)
 Iniforis speciosa (Adams & Reeve, 1850): synonym of Mastoniaeforis speciosa (A. Adams & Reeve, 1850)
 Iniforis undata (Kosuge, 1962): synonym of Mastonia undata Kosuge, 1962
 Iniforis violaceus: synonym of Iniforis violacea (Quoy & Gaimard, 1834) (incorrect gender ending)

References

External links

 Jousseaume, F. (1884). Monographie des Triforidae. Bulletins de la Société Malacologique de France. 1: 217-270, pl. 4.
 B.A. (1983) A revision of the Recent Triphoridae of southern Australia. Records of the Australian Museum supplement 2: 1-119

Triphoridae